Mike Gottsch is a former American football coach. He served as the head football coach at Tabor College in Hillsboro, Kansas from 2007 to 2009, conpluing a record of 3–27. The only win in his first season as head coach was a victory over Panhandle State University.

After the conclusion of the 2009 season at Tabor, Gottsch took a head coaching position at Sapulpa High School in Sapulpa, Oklahoma. He compiled a record of 22–28 at Sapulpa before he was fired midseason in October 2014. Gottsch is a native of Elkhorn, Nebraska.

Personal life
Gottsch earned a bachelor's degree in physical education from Tabor and a master's degree in secondary education from Chadron State College, where he was an assistant coach.

Head coaching record

College

References

Year of birth missing (living people)
Living people
American football quarterbacks
Moorpark Raiders football players
Tabor Bluejays football coaches
Tabor Bluejays football players
High school football coaches in Indiana
High school football coaches in Kansas
High school football coaches in Nebraska
High school football coaches in Oklahoma
Chadron State College alumni
Sportspeople from Omaha, Nebraska
Coaches of American football from Nebraska
Players of American football from Nebraska